Reunion Hill is a 1997 album by singer-songwriter Richard Shindell.  It was Shindell's third and final studio album for Shanachie Records.  Allmusic calls the album "songcraft at its finest." The album includes a cover of "I'll Be Here in the Morning" by Townes Van Zandt who died earlier that same year.

Shindell composed the title song in 1996 for Joan Baez,
who later included it on her Gone From Danger album. It was also covered by Fairport Convention on their 2011 CD Festival Bell and Show of Hands on their 2012 album Wake the Union. The song is written from the perspective of a Civil War widow. Baez also covered "Money for Floods" on Gone From Danger.

Track listing
All songs by Richard Shindell except where noted
 "The Next Best Western" – 4:35 
 "Smiling" (Larry Campbell, Shindell) – 4:43
 "May" – 4:37
 "I Saw My Youth Today" – 3:18 
 "Reunion Hill" – 4:28 
 "Beyond the Iron Gate" – 5:24 
 "Darkness, Darkness" (Jesse Colin Young) – 3:56 
 "Money for Floods" – 3:46 
 "Easy Street" – 3:58 
 "The Weather" – 3:49 
 "I'll Be Here in the Morning" (Townes Van Zandt) – 4:18

Personnel
Musicians:
 Richard Shindell – vocals, acoustic guitar, harmony, percussion
 Larry Campbell – acoustic, electric and baritone guitars, bouzouki, mandolin, pedal steel, lap steel, fiddle, percussion
 Lucy Kaplansky – harmony
 Frank Vilardi – drums, percussion
 Radoslav Lorković – piano, Hammond B3, harmonium, accordion
 Dave Richards – electric and upright bass
 Robby Walsh – Bodhran
 Teresa Williams – harmony

Production
 Produced by Larry Campbell
 Recorded by Tim Conklin at Sorcerer Sound New York City
 and by Al Hemberger, Matt Baxter and Roy Matthews at The Loft Bronxville, New York
 Mixed at The Loft by Larry Campbell, Al Hemberger, and Richard Shindell

References

1997 albums
Albums produced by Larry Campbell (musician)
Richard Shindell albums